Kickxia commutata, the Mediterranean fluellen, is a species of perennial herb in the family Plantaginaceae. They have a self-supporting growth form and simple, broad leaves. Individuals can grow to 5 cm tall.

Sources

References 

commutata
Flora of Malta